The Academy of Sciences Malaysia (Malay: Akademi Sains Malaysia) is a statutory body in the Malaysian government established under an act of Parliament (Academy of Sciences Malaysia Act 1994). The Academy, abbreviated as ASM, is the highest scientific advisory body of Malaysia, and is organizationally under the Ministry of Energy, Science, Technology, Environment and Climate Change (MESTECC).

Its purpose is to be the ‘Think Tank’ of Malaysia for matters related to science, engineering, technology and innovation, and to pursue excellence in the fields of science, engineering and technology. The Academy consists (as of 2018) of 353 Fellows in eight science disciplines. The current President is Professor Datuk Dr Asma Ismail.

History 

In 1995, ASM was established under the “Academy of Sciences Malaysia Act 1994” with 50 Foundation Fellows.

The Academy's first office was located in Jalan Tun Ismail, Kuala Lumpur, part of historical remains from the British Colonial era in Kuala Lumpur. The office serves as the administration center of the Academy and as a meeting place for ASM Council and its various committees.

In 2013, ASM moved its main office to Menara MATRADE at Jalan Sultan Haji Ahmad Shah, Kuala Lumpur. The new office, located on Level 20, serves as the administration office, publications library, meeting venue, and place of gathering. The office in Jalan Tun Ismail remains operational, and hosts two regional offices: International Science, Technology and Innovation Centre for South – South Cooperation (ISTIC-UNESCO), and International Science Council – Regional Office for Asia and the Pacific (ISC ROAP).

Activities 

ASM provides independent input on science, technology and innovation, or STI, and advice on STI related issues of national and international importance. As of 2018, its products  include reports on strategic foresight towards Progressive Malaysia 2050, sustainability science, emerging technology, and socio-economics.

ASM is the national selection body for Malaysian scientists to participate in international programs such as Lindau Nobel Laureate Meetings, and CERN Summer Student Program. The Academy is also one of the delivery partners of the Newton-Ungku Omar Fund, the Malaysian branch of the Newton Fund. ASM launched the Top Research Scientists Malaysia in 2012 as online database of the nation's scientists. It established the Young Scientists Network – Academy of Sciences Malaysia as a platform to promote career in science. It conducts the National Science Challenge, an annual science competition for secondary school students where the champions win a chance for a study trip in Stockholm, Sweden and attend the Nobel Prize Ceremony.

In 2012, ASM began the Inquiry Based Science Education (IBSE) initiative by training IBSE to primary school teachers, developed from the La Main A La Pate (LAMAP) model developed by French Academy of Sciences.

Since 2015, the Academy is also involved in setting up the country's National STEM Centre as a professional development centre for STEM teachers and lab technicians using IBSE approach.

Awards   
In 2005, ASM launched the Mahathir Science Award, in honour of Tun Dr Mahathir Mohamad (Malaysia's 4th Prime Minister and an Honorary Fellow of the Academy). The award is given for breakthroughs in the fields of Tropical Agriculture, Tropical Architecture & Engineering, Tropical Medicine, and Tropical Natural Resources. In 2010, the Mahathir Science Award Foundation (MSAF) was set up to manage and oversee this award. 

Since 2005, ASM is a collaborator of the annual MAKNA Cancer Research Award. The research grant by Majlis Kanser Nasional is awarded to young Malaysian researchers. Through 2018, a total of 53 researchers have been awarded the grant.

Organisation  
The Academy is governed by a Council of 16  comprising the President, Vice President, Secretary General, Treasurer, and twelve other members who are all Fellows.

The President is appointed by Yang Di-Pertuan Agong, the King of Malaysia, on the recommendation of the Minister of Energy, Science, Technology, Environment and Climate Change.

1st President (1995 – 2001): Academician Emeritus Professor Tan Sri Datuk Dr Omar Abdul Rahman  
2nd President (2001 – 2007): Tan Sri Datuk Dr Ahmad Zaharudin Idrus
3rd President (2007 – 2010): Academician Tan Sri Datuk Dr Yusof Basiron  
4th President (2010 – 2016): Academician Tan Sri Datuk Ir Dr Ahmad Tajuddin Ali
5th President (2018 – Present): Professor Datuk Dr Asma Ismail

The council is made up of the President, Vice President, Secretary General and Treasurer and twelve other members all of whom are Fellows.

Members 
Membership of ASM consists of Malaysia's top scientists in science, engineering, technology and innovation.

Fellow 
A Fellow of the Academy is entitled to use the title ‘Fellow of the Academy of Sciences Malaysia’ with the abbreviation FASc, after their name. To date, ASM has 353 Fellows. At the establishment of ASM in 1995, 50 individuals were appointed as Foundation Fellows. Subsequent  Fellows have been elected at the annual general meeting.

Fellows of ASM are divided into eight disciplines. Number in each discipline (as of 2018): 1. Biological, Agricultural and Environmental Sciences: 75 Fellows2. Chemical Sciences : 40 Fellows3. Engineering Sciences: 64 Fellows4. Information Technology & Computer Sciences: 20 Fellows5. Mathematics, Physics & Earth Sciences: 45 Fellows6. Medical & Health Sciences: 64 Fellows7. Science & Technology Development Industry: 37 Fellows8. Social Sciences & Humanities: 7 Fellows

Honorary Fellow 
An Honorary Fellow is a person who has made or is making a distinguished contribution to the practice of science, engineering or technology that will benefit the work of the Academy. Honorary Fellows are elected at the Academy's annual general meeting.

To date, the Academy has appointed six Honorary Fellows:
 Tun Dr Mahathir Mohamad
 Tun Dr Abdullah Ahmad Badawi
 Tun Ahmad Sarji Abdul Hamid
 Nobel Laureate Professor Lee Yuan Tseh
 YB Tan Sri Dato’ Seri Law Hieng Ding
 Dato' Sri Mohd Najib Abdul Razak

Senior Fellow 
The Council appoints Senior Fellows from among Fellows of the Academy.

Their appointment is based on the recommendation of a special panel comprising members and non-members of the Academy who are appointed by the Minister of Energy, Science, Technology, Environment, and Climate Change. A Senior Fellow is entitled to be addressed as an ‘Academician’. To date, there are 28 Senior Fellows.

Associates 
Associates of ASM are appointed by the council for a two-year term to represent ASM at external meetings, contribute and involve in various studies and committees. Current number of ASM Associates is 39 (in 2018).

References

External links
 Website

Government of Malaysia
Education in Malaysia
Higher education in Malaysia
Think tanks based in Malaysia
Research institutes in Malaysia
Think tanks established in 1995
1995 establishments in Malaysia
Members of the International Science Council